Arcot N. Veeraswami is a former  minister for electricity in the Tamil Nadu State of India. He became the treasurer of the Dravida Munnetra Kazhagam Party and emerged as number three in the party after Karunanidhi and K Anbazhagan in the early 1980s. He was treated as the right-hand person to Karunanidhi and was also said to be the main peacemaker in the party. He was born in Kuppadichatham village in North Arcot district in Tamil Nadu on 21 April 1931 to Narayanasamy Naidu and Jeyammal couple. He finished his education before actively engaging in politics. He was elected to the Tamil Nadu assembly six times. From 1989 to 1991, during the DMK rule, he served as the Minister for Food   and from 1996 to 2001 as the Minister for Health  &  Electricity. Furthermore, during 2006 - 2011 he served as the Minister for Electricity and Rural Industries.

Politics
Veerasamy worked as a clerk in the state electricity board before being handpicked by DMK's founder, C N Annadurai, as a candidate for the Arcot constituency in 1967; after which he became the treasurer of the DMK Party and emerged as number three in the party after Karunanidhi and K Anbazhagan in the early eighties. Following his rise in popularity, Veerasamy rose in the party's ranks and was unanimously elected as the Treasurer of Dravida Munnetras Kazhagam in 1994 to 2008. He has been a member of the Dravida Munnetra Kazhagam party for a long time and has been elected to the Tamil Nadu assembly six times. He has participated in several agitations against oppression staged by Dravida Munnetra Kazhagam, and has courted arrest several times, the most notable being  MISA   in 1976 when he was arrested and tortured for one year. He lost his hearing in one ear. He was elected as a Member of the Legislative Assembly from Arcot constituency in 1967 and 1971, Purasaiwalkam constituency in 1989, and Annanagar constituency in 1996, 2001, and 2006 in the General elections. He also served as a Member of the Legislative Council from 1977 to 1988.

He was sworn in as Minister of the Govt of Tamil Nadu thrice during 1989,1996 and 2006 as  Minister For Food, Minister for Health and Electricity and Minister For Electricity and Rural Industries respectively.

Elections contested and results

References 

1937 births
Living people
Dravida Munnetra Kazhagam politicians
State cabinet ministers of Tamil Nadu
Tamil Nadu MLAs 1996–2001
Tamil Nadu politicians